Martin H. Pomeroy was interim Chief of Police of the Los Angeles Police Department between May 7, 2002 and October 26, 2002.

References
 The LAPD: Chief Parks. Los Angeles Police Department. Accessed 2011-03-11.

Chiefs of the Los Angeles Police Department
Living people
Year of birth missing (living people)
Place of birth missing (living people)